Barkatha Assembly constituency   is an assembly constituency in  the Indian state of Jharkhand.

Overview
Barkatha Assembly constituency covers: Barkatha and Jainagar Police Stations in Kodarma sub-division; and Ichak Police Station in Hazaribagh Sadar sub-division.

Barkatha assembly constituency is part of Kodarma (Lok Sabha constituency).

Members of Legislative Assembly

One of the senior leaders from this constituency was Late Sukhdeo Yadav. He contested election from JNP and won with huge margin of 29806 votes. The runner up Narbadeshwar Singh got just 16% of what Sukhdeo Yadav got. This is so far the biggest victory by any leader in Barkatha constituency.

Election Results

2019

See also
Vidhan Sabha
List of states of India by type of legislature

References
Schedule – XIII of Constituencies Order, 2008 of Delimitation of Parliamentary and Assembly constituencies Order, 2008 of the Election Commission of India 
3. Sukhdeo Yadav victory margin in 1977 election https://www.latestly.com/elections/assembly-elections/bihar/1977/barkatha/
http://www.thehindu.com/news/national/other-states/six-jvmp-mlas-join-bjp/article6882145.ece

Assembly constituencies of Jharkhand